Best Supporting Actor may refer any one of many different awards, including:

 AACTA International Award for Best Supporting Actor
 AVN Award for Best Supporting Actor
 Academy Award for Best Supporting Actor
 Black Reel Award: Best Supporting Actor
 Boston Society of Film Critics Award for Best Supporting Actor
 British Academy Television Award for Best Supporting Actor
 Broadcast Film Critics Association Award for Best Supporting Actor
 Chicago Film Critics Association Award for Best Supporting Actor
 César Award for Best Supporting Actor
 Dallas-Fort Worth Film Critics Association Award for Best Supporting Actor
 David di Donatello for Best Supporting Actor
 Empire Award for Best Supporting Actor
 Filmfare Award for Best Supporting Actor
 Florida Film Critics Circle Award for Best Supporting Actor
 Golden Calf Award for Best Supporting Actor
 Golden Globe Award for Best Supporting Actor – Motion Picture
 Golden Globe Award for Best Supporting Actor – Series, Miniseries or Television Film
 Goya Award for Best Supporting Actor
 Hong Kong Film Award for Best Supporting Actor
 Hundred Flowers Award for Best Supporting Actor
 Independent Spirit Award for Best Supporting Male
 Los Angeles Film Critics Association Award for Best Supporting Actor
 National Board of Review Award for Best Supporting Actor
 National Film Award for Best Supporting Actor
 National Society of Film Critics Award for Best Supporting Actor
 New York Film Critics Circle Award for Best Supporting Actor
 Online Film Critics Society Award for Best Supporting Actor
 Polish Academy Award for Best Supporting Actor
 San Diego Film Critics Society Award for Best Supporting Actor
 Satellite Award for Best Supporting Actor – Motion Picture
 Satellite Award for Best Supporting Actor – Series, Miniseries or Television Film
 Satellite Award for Best Supporting Actor – Television Series
 Saturn Award for Best Supporting Actor on Television
 Saturn Award for Best Supporting Actor
 St. Louis Gateway Film Critics Association Award for Best Supporting Actor
 TVB Anniversary Award for Best Supporting Actor
 Toronto Film Critics Association Award for Best Supporting Actor
 Vancouver Film Critics Circle Award for Best Supporting Actor
 Washington D.C. Area Film Critics Association Award for Best Supporting Actor

See also
 Best Actor in a Supporting Role (disambiguation)
 Supporting actor
 List of awards for supporting actor